Carlos Kennedy (born 16 February 1911, date of death unknown) was an Argentine swimmer. He competed in the men's 4 × 200 metre freestyle relay at the 1932 Summer Olympics.

References

External links
 

1911 births
Year of death missing
Argentine male freestyle swimmers
Olympic swimmers of Argentina
Swimmers at the 1932 Summer Olympics
Sportspeople from Entre Ríos Province